ZNC-FM is a classical music radio station in Nassau, Bahamas transmitting on 98.1 MHz.

External links 

Radio stations in the Bahamas
Classical music radio stations
Radio stations established in 2012